Gryżyński Potok (also Gryżynka) is a river of Poland, a tributary of the Oder near Radnica.

Rivers of Poland
Rivers of Lubusz Voivodeship